Oleandra is a genus of ferns. In the Pteridophyte Phylogeny Group classification of 2016 (PPG I), it is the only genus in the family Oleandraceae, which is placed in suborder Polypodiineae, order Polypodiales. Alternatively, the family may be placed in a very broadly defined family Polypodiaceae sensu lato as the subfamily Oleandroideae.

The genus contains about 15 species. Most are erect ground ferns or scandent epiphytes that start from the ground. The lamina (leafy area of the fronds) are simple or pinnate, and the individual pinnae are articulate to the rachis. The sporangia are contained in discrete round sori in a single row on either side of the midrib of the fronds.

Phylogeny
The following cladogram for the suborder Polypodiineae (eupolypods I), based on the consensus cladogram in the Pteridophyte Phylogeny Group classification of 2016 (PPG I), shows a likely phylogenetic relationship between Oleandraceae and the other families of the clade.

References

Polypodiales
Fern genera
Taxa named by Antonio José Cavanilles